The following article presents a summary of the 1913 football (soccer) season in Brazil, which was the 12th season of competitive football in the country.

Campeonato Paulista

In 1913 there were two different editions of the Campeonato Paulista. One was organized by the Associação Paulista de Esportes Atléticos (APEA) while the other one was organized by the Liga Paulista de Foot-Ball (LPF).

APEA's Campeonato Paulista

Final Standings

Paulistano declared as the APEA's Campeonato Paulista champions.

LPF's Campeonato Paulista

Final Standings

Santos matches were canceled, as the club abandoned the competition.

Americano-SP declared as the LPF's Campeonato Paulista champions.

State championship champions

References

 Brazilian competitions at RSSSF

 
Seasons in Brazilian football
Brazil